Yekta is originally a Persian female name meaning the only one. It is also used in Turkish as a given name (mostly) for males. People named Yekta include:

Given name
 Yekta Jamali (born 2004), Iranian weightlifter
 Yekta Kurtuluş (born 1985), Turkish football player
 Yekta Naser (born 1978), Iranian actress
 Yekta Güngör Özden (born 1932), Turkish judge
 Yekta Uzunoglu (born 1953), Turkish writer
 Yekta Yılmaz Gül (born 1978), Turkish Greco-Roman wrestler

Middle name
 Ahmet Yektâ Madran (1885–1950), Turkish composer
 Rauf Yekta (1871–1935), Turkish musicologist

Persian feminine given names
Turkish feminine given names
Turkish masculine given names